Khirbet Ghazi is a village in western Syria, administratively part of the Homs Governorate, southwest of Homs. Nearby localities include Wujuh al-Hajar and Laftaya to the southwest. According to the Central Bureau of Statistics (CBS), Khirbet Ghazi had a population of 3,056 in the 2004 census.

References

Populated places in Homs District